Sisophon was a changwat (province) of Thailand. In 1906 it was ceded to French Indochina. It is now part of Cambodia and known as Banteay Meanchey.

History
During the 16th century and before, Sisophon was known as Srey Saophon meaning in Khmer "Beautiful Lady" and it was a small district, belonging to Battambang Province.

After the 17th century the Siamese took over Battambang Province and Siem Reap Province in a successful military campaign.

Battambang Province and Siem Reap province were established as provinces of Siam and renamed as Phra Tabong and Siam Nakhon respectively and Srey Saophon was renamed as Sisophon.

In 1907 the French colonial administration of Cambodia negotiated with the Siamese government to cede Battambang Province and Siem Reap Province to the French Protectorate of Cambodia in exchange of Trat and Dan Sai and the names of these province reverted to their Khmer names. 
In 1907 Srisophon was changed officially back to Serey Saophoan meaning in Khmer "Beautiful Freedom" implying freedom from the nearly 200 years of Siamese control.

After the Khmer Rouge years, Battambang Province was broken up into two provinces. Those provinces are now a part of present-day Battambang Province and Banteay Meanchey Province. Sisophon was made the capital city of Banteay Meanchey Province.

See also
 Sisophon

References

External links
The Land Boundaries of Indochina: Cambodia, Laos and Vietnam

Former provinces of Thailand
French protectorate of Cambodia